Xenorhabdus bovienii  is a bacterium from the genus of Xenorhabdus which has been isolated from the nematode Steinernema bibionis, Steinernema krsussei, Steinernema affine, Steinernema carpocapsae, Steinernema feltiae, Steinernema intermedium, Steinernema jollieti and Steinernema weiseri. Xenorhabdus bovienii produces N-Butanoylpyrrothine, N-(3-Methylbutanoyl)pyrrothine and Xenocyloins.

References

Further reading

External links
Type strain of Xenorhabdus bovienii at BacDive -  the Bacterial Diversity Metadatabase

Bacteria described in 1993